Lois Lamya al-Faruqi, born Lois Ibsen, (July 25, 1926 - May 27, 1986), was an expert on Islamic art and music and was married to Ismail al-Faruqi.

Biography 
She was born in Montana. She earned her B.A. in music from the University of Montana (1948) studying piano. She then entered Indiana University, where she was awarded an M.A. in music (1949). During this period, she met and married Ismail Raji al-Faruqi. She became an expert on the music of the Arab world and obtained her Ph.D. from Syracuse University on that subject. She and her husband both became professors at Temple University.

Al-Faruqi was murdered along with her husband on the morning of May 27, 1986, at their home in Pennsylvania.

Al-Faruqi also co-authored The Cultural Atlas of Islam with her husband, which was published posthumously by Macmillan.

Bibliography

Books
 (1986) The Cultural Atlas of Islam, co-authored with Ismail Raji' al-Faruqi, NY: Macmillan
(2002) Women, Muslim society, and Islam,  IL: American Trust Pub

Articles
 (undated) Women In a Quranic Society
 (undated) Islamic Traditions & The Feminist Movement: Confrontation or Co-operation?
 (1985) "Music, Musicians, and Muslim Law." Asian Music, Vol. 17, No.1: 3-36.

References
Regula Burckhardt Qureshi. "Lois Lamya Ibsen al-Faruqi (1927-1986)" Ethnomusicology Vol. 32, No. 2 (Spring - Summer, 1988), pp. 93-96 (4 pages) Published By: University of Illinois Press

1926 births
1986 deaths
Historians of Islamic art
1986 murders in the United States
Deaths by stabbing in Pennsylvania
University of Montana alumni
Indiana University alumni
Syracuse University alumni
Temple University faculty
American murder victims
Women scholars of Islam
American Muslims